Jean Lud Cadet is a Haitian-American psychiatrist at the National Institute on Drug Abuse (NIDA), where he serves as National Institutes of Health Chief of the Molecular Neuropsychiatry Research Branch. His research considers the genetic, epigenetic and cellular bases of substance abuse. In 2020 he was selected as one of Cell Press' Most Inspiring Black Scientists in America.

Early life and education 
Cadet is from Haiti. He attended the Collège Notre-Dame for high school. After graduating high school, Cadet moved to New York City in 1970, where he joined Columbia University to complete a degree in medicine. He was a psychiatry resident at both Columbia University and in the Mount Sinai Health System.

Research and career 
In 1992 Cadet moved to the National Institute on Drug Abuse (NIDA), where he serves as National Institutes of Health Chief of the Molecular Neuropsychiatry Research Branch. His early research considered the effects of drugs on human memory. He has shown that the molecular networks within the brain are impacted by the acute administration of addictive substances. In particular, Cadet has considered the cellular mechanisms that underpin addiction of psychostimulants. Cadet has looked at the influence of addictive substances on the expression of immediate early gene (IEGs), and shown that IEGs can be induced within minutes of activation. 

He has studied self-administration of methamphetamine, and shown that in striatal dopaminergic systems it is accompanied with markers of toxicity. This indicates that dopamine activates neurodegenerative processes within the brain, via the upregulation of neurotrophic factors and downregulation of glutamatergic systems.

Select publications

References 

American psychiatrists
Living people
Year of birth missing (living people)
Columbia University Vagelos College of Physicians and Surgeons alumni